Ridge Manor is a historic apartment building at the northeast corner of Ridge Avenue and Davis Street in Evanston, Illinois. The three-story brick building was built in 1916. The building consists of two sections; the section facing Ridge Avenue contains the building's larger apartments, while the U-shaped section facing Davis Street contains smaller apartments and includes an open courtyard. Architect William H. Pruyn, Jr., designed the building. The building's design features limestone detailing, protruding bays, and a cornice and parapet at the roof line.

The building was added to the National Register of Historic Places on March 15, 1984.

References

Buildings and structures on the National Register of Historic Places in Cook County, Illinois
Residential buildings on the National Register of Historic Places in Illinois
Buildings and structures in Evanston, Illinois
Apartment buildings in Illinois
Residential buildings completed in 1916